Transport in the Czech Republic relies on several main modes, including transport by road, rail, water and air.

Railways

The vast majority is standard gauge. Electrified railways generally have voltages of 3 kV DC or 25 kV AC.  of track is narrow gauge. The most prominent Czech railway company is the state-owned České dráhy (ČD) (English: Czech Railways). Prague has an underground rapid transit system, the Prague Metro. In addition, the cities of Brno, Liberec, Most, Olomouc, Ostrava, Plzeň, and Prague have tram systems.

Roads

The Czech Republic has, in total,  of roads. It has  of motorways. In the 1980s and 1990s there was a significant increase in passenger transport on the roads in the Czech Republic, which was associated with a sharp increase in the accident rate. Between 2007 and 2013, the death rate fell in every year, with a record low of 583 deaths in 2013, compared with the 1994 high of 1,473 casualties. Despite this however, the fatality rate per head of population is moderately high, comparable to the United States.

Highways

The highways in the Czech Republic are no longer divided into motorways and expressways as of 2016.

These dual carriageways are managed by the state-owned Road and Motorway Directorate of the Czech Republic – ŘSD, established in 1997. Among the first modern highways in the Czech Republic was the motorway from Prague to the Slovak border through Brno whose construction was started on May 2, 1939.

ŘSD currently manages and maintains 1,247 km of motorways (dálnice).

Waterways
The Vltava is the country's longest river, at 430 km. 358 km of the Elbe (Labe), which totals 1154 km, is also present in the country. An artificial waterway, nowadays used for recreation, is the Baťa Canal.

Ports and harbors
Děčín, Mělník, Prague, Ústí nad Labem, Moldauhafen in Hamburg (no longer operational, will be handed over to Germany in 2028)

Airports

In 2006, the Czech Republic had a total 121 airports. 46 of these airports had paved runways while 75 had unpaved runways. The largest and busiest airport in the Czech Republic is Václav Havel Airport Prague, opened in 1937. Other international airports include Brno–Tuřany Airport, Karlovy Vary Airport, Ostrava Leoš Janáček Airport, Pardubice Airport, Kunovice Airport and Public domestic and private international airport is for example Hradec Králové Airport.

Airports with paved runways 
Total: 46 (2007)  
 Over 3,047 m: 2 
 2,438 to 3,047 m: 10 
 1,524 to 2,437 m: 13 
 914 to 1,523 m: 2 
 Under 914 m: 19  

Airports with unpaved runways 
Total: 75 (2007)  
 1,524 to 2,437 m: 1 
 914 to 1,523 m: 25 
 Under 914 m: 49

Heliports
2 (2006)

See also
Czech Republic
List of airports in the Czech Republic
Road signs in the Czech Republic
European driving licence

References

External links
Czech Transport
idos.cz - public transport on-line timetables and trip planner (sponsored by the government)
Transport in the Czech Republic

 

cs:Česko#Doprava